Adamowizna may refer to either of two villages in Poland:

Adamowizna, Masovian Voivodeship
Adamowizna, Podlaskie Voivodeship